Cornus is a genus of woody plants in the family Cornaceae, commonly known as dogwoods.

Cornus may also refer to:

 Cornus, Aveyron, a commune in the 'Aveyron' département of France
 Cornus, Sardinia, an archaeological site in Sardinia
 Battle of Cornus (215 BC), a battle on Sardinia in the Second Punic War 
 Cornus mas, the Cornelian cherry, or dogwood cherry, a medium to large deciduous shrub

See also
 Cornu (disambiguation)